Maurice Michael Keliher (January 11, 1890 – September 7, 1930) was a professional baseball first baseman. He played in three games for the 1911 Pittsburgh Pirates and in 2 games for the 1912 Pirates. In 7 at-bats he never recorded a Major League hit.

He began his professional career in 1910 with Petersburg and Portsmouth of the Virginia League.  After his major league appearances he continued to play in the minor leagues.  He spent the last four years of his minor career (1926–1929) with the class D Blue Ridge League.  In 1926, he led the Blue Ridge League with a .370 batting average.  He was later a player/manager for the Chambersburg Maroons (1927–1928) and Hagerstown Hubs (1929).

In 1930, Keliher was killed in a car accident in Washington, D.C. Murder charges were filed against two men after witnesses stated they saw Keliher be thrown out of the car before the collision.

Further reading
Johnson, Lloyd and Wolff, Miles, editors: Encyclopedia of Minor League Baseball. Durham, North Carolina Publisher: Baseball America, 2007. Format: Hardback, 767 pp.

References 

Major League Baseball first basemen
Pittsburgh Pirates players
Baseball players from Washington, D.C.
1890 births
1930 deaths
Minor league baseball managers
Portsmouth Truckers players
Petersburg Goobers players
Montreal Royals players
Hartford Senators players
Worcester Busters players
Richmond Climbers players
Springfield Reapers players
Peoria Tractors players
Regina Senators players
Rocky Mount Tar Heels players
Greenville Spinners players
Norfolk Tars players
Decatur Commodores players
Martinsburg Blue Sox players
Chambersburg Maroons players
Hagerstown Hubs players
Road incident deaths in Washington, D.C.